Timla is a very small village in Bijnor District, Uttar Pradesh, India. Most of its inhabitants are farmers. Timla has a population of about 565. Males constitute 54% of the population and females 46%. Teemla has an average literacy rate of 48%; male literacy is 52% and female literacy is 43%. In Timla, 16% of the population is under 6 years of age. The population of this village is formed by Rajputs and Harijans. The most older families in Timla are Lalla Family, Chunna Family and Sarcinia.
All population is dependent on farming only; very few families are dependent on government or private jobs. All farmers have well standard of living and having all modern facilities in their homes like color TV, motorcycles, and tractors.

Villages in Bijnor district